Group A of the 1995 FIFA Women's World Cup took place from 5 to 9 June 1995. The group consisted of Brazil, Germany, Japan and hosts Sweden.

Standings

Matches
All times listed are local, CEST (UTC+2).

Germany vs Japan

Sweden vs Brazil

Sweden vs Germany

Brazil vs Japan

Sweden vs Japan

Brazil vs Germany

References

External links
FIFA Women's World Cup Sweden 1995, FIFA.com

1995 FIFA Women's World Cup
Brazil at the 1995 FIFA Women's World Cup
Germany at the 1995 FIFA Women's World Cup
Japan at the 1995 FIFA Women's World Cup
Sweden at the 1995 FIFA Women's World Cup